is a Japanese Nippon Professional Baseball player for the Yomiuri Giants in Japan's Central League. Before playing for the Giants he was a member of the Hokkaido Nippon-Ham Fighters.

When he comes to bat, his fans often sing a cheer that goes to the tune of a song from the Super Nintendo Entertainment System game EarthBound.

External links

Furuki Cheer Song, on Youtube

1976 births
People from Kashiwa
Baseball people from Chiba Prefecture
Hokkaido Nippon-Ham Fighters players
Japanese baseball coaches
Japanese baseball players
Living people
Nippon Ham Fighters players
Nippon Professional Baseball coaches
Nippon Professional Baseball infielders
Yomiuri Giants players